Flow My Firetear is the fifth album by the Danish rock act Sort Sol known earlier as Sods, and the third after the renaming. It was released in March 1991. The album was the band's first commercial success and included the hits "Siggimund Blue" and "Midnight Train To Summer".

Track listing
"Siggimund Blue" - 4:20 (Odde/Odde, P.P.)
"Daughter of Sad" - 3:17 (Jørgensen/Top-Galia)
"Girl of 1000 Tears" - 2:52 (Odde)
"Carry Me into the Sun" - 3:14 (Odde)
"Midnight Train to Summer" - 4:04 (Odde/Jørgensen, Odde, Ortved, P.P., Top-Galia)
"Desdemona" - 3:30 (Jørgensen/P.P.)
"Two Tongue Tale" - 3:18 (Jørgensen/Odde, Ortved, P.P., Top-Galia)
"Dyanna Thorne" - 2:37 (Odde)
"Tatlin Tower" - 3:40 (Odde/Odde, P.P.)

Personnel
Sort Sol
 Steen Jørgensen – vocals
 Knud Odde – bass guitar
 Peter Peter – lead guitar
 Lars Top-Galia – rhythm guitar
 Tomas Ortved – drums

Additional musicians and production
 Wili Jønsson – piano and backing vocals on "Daughter Of Sad"
 Lise Cabble – vocals on "Carry Me Into The Sun", "Midnight Train To Summer" and "Two tongue Tale"
 Link Wray Add. – rhythm guitar on "Tatlin Tower"
 Flemming Rasmussen – engineering
 Peter Iversen – engineering
 Lene Reidel – mastering

1991 albums
Sort Sol albums
Columbia Records albums